Santo André is a freguesia (civil parish) of Cape Verde. It covers the smaller, northwestern part of the municipality of Porto Novo, on the island of Santo Antão.

Settlements
The freguesia consists of the following settlements (population at the 2010 census):

Alto Mira (pop: 1,003)
Chã de Branquinho (pop: 114)
Chã de Norte (pop: 241)
Jorge Luis (pop: 347)
Martiene (pop: 446)
Monte Trigo (pop: 274)
Norte (pop: 595)
Ribeira da Cruz (pop: 421)

References

Porto Novo Municipality
Parishes of Cape Verde